Narcisse Fish Abada (born January 12, 1982) is a Cameroonian former professional footballer who played as a  midfielder.

Club career
Abada played for Cameroonian top sides Union Douala and Tonnerre Yaounde before moving to Albanian teams SK Tirana and then KS Flamurtari Vlorë. In the January 2008 transfer window he signed for Hibernians.

References

External links
Narcisse Fish Abada - Camfoot

1982 births
Living people
Cameroonian footballers
Association football midfielders
Cameroon international footballers
Union Douala players
Tonnerre Yaoundé players
KF Tirana players
Flamurtari Vlorë players
Hibernians F.C. players
Cameroonian expatriate footballers
Cameroonian expatriate sportspeople in Albania
Expatriate footballers in Albania
Cameroonian expatriate sportspeople in Malta
Expatriate footballers in Malta